Baloy is both a given name and a surname. Notable people with the name include:
Baloy McCowen (1893–1959), American illustrator
Baldomero Aguinaldo y Baloy (1869–1915), leader of the Philippine Revolution
Felipe Baloy (born 1981), Panamanian footballer
Félix Baloy (born 1943), Cuban singer, sonero, and percussionist

Spanish-language surnames